Barbara Ann Marshall (born January 27, 1957) is an American former swimmer and former world record-holder.

Marshall represented the United States in the 1972 Summer Olympics in Munich, Germany.  She swam for the gold medal-winning U.S. team in the preliminary heats of the women's 4×100-meter freestyle relay, but did not receive a medal.  Under the international swimming rules in effect in 1972, only those relay swimmers who competed in the event final received medals.  Individually, she also competed in the women's 200-meter freestyle, and placed fourth in the event final with a time of 2:05.45.

See also
 List of Olympic medalists in swimming (women)
 List of University of North Carolina at Chapel Hill alumni
 World record progression 4 × 100 metres freestyle relay

References

1957 births
Living people
American female freestyle swimmers
World record setters in swimming
North Carolina Tar Heels women's swimmers
Olympic swimmers of the United States
Sportspeople from Ann Arbor, Michigan
Swimmers at the 1972 Summer Olympics